The 1982-83 French Rugby Union Championship was won by Béziers < beating RC Nice  in the final.

The group B was won by Hagetmau    beating Paris UC  in the final.

Formula 
Both group are formed by 40 clubs divide in four pool of ten clubs.

In both group the two better of each pool were admitted directly to "last 16" round of knockout stage, while the classified from 3rd to 6th of each pool were admitted to a barrage.

Group A

Qualification round 

The teams are listed as the ranking, in bold the teams admitted directly to "last 16" round.

Barrage 
In bold the clubs qualified for the next round

"Last 16" 
In bold the clubs qualified for the next round

Quarter of finals 
In bold the clubs qualified for the next round

Semifinals

Final 

Another tile won by Bezièrs,  the 10th in the history and 9th in last dozen of years.

Group B

Final

External links
 Compte rendu finale 1983 lnr.fr

1983
France
Championship